Francisco Javier 'Javi' López Díaz (born 20 April 1988) is a Spanish footballer who plays for Juventud de Torremolinos CF as a right winger.

Club career
López was born in Málaga, Andalusia. As a product of hometown Málaga CF's youth ranks, he made his first-team – and La Liga – debut on 7 November 2009, scoring in a 2–2 away draw against CD Tenerife; another player promoted from the reserves, Daniel Toribio, also made his first appearance in that game.

Firmly established in the side's starting XI, López netted his second goal on 31 January 2010 in a 2–0 victory at Atlético Madrid. For the 2010–11 season, however, he was loaned to SD Ponferradina, recently returned to the Segunda División, alongside teammate Toribio. He scored his first goal on 11 September, but this happened in a 1–5 home loss to Villarreal CF B.

López was again loaned the following summer, this time to Real Jaén of Segunda División B. He made his official debut on 18 September 2011 in a 2−0 home defeat of CD Puertollano, and scored his first goal on 12 February of the following year in a 1−1 draw against the same opponents.

On 6 June 2012, López was told that his contract would not be renewed by Málaga, and he would be free to start looking for a new club. The following month, he signed with Getafe CF's reserves in division three; he continued competing in that tier the following years, representing a host of teams.

References

External links

1988 births
Living people
Spanish footballers
Footballers from Málaga
Association football wingers
La Liga players
Segunda División players
Segunda División B players
Tercera División players
Segunda Federación players
Tercera Federación players
Atlético Malagueño players
Málaga CF players
SD Ponferradina players
Real Jaén footballers
Getafe CF B players
CD Guadalajara (Spain) footballers
Real Murcia players
Lorca FC players
Lleida Esportiu footballers
Pontevedra CF footballers